is a Japanese politician serving in the House of Representatives in the Diet (national legislature) as a member of the Democratic Party of Japan. A native of Yokote, Akita and graduate of Chuo University he was elected for the first time in 2003.

References

External links
 Official website

Living people
1971 births
People from Yokote, Akita
Democratic Party of Japan politicians
Members of the House of Representatives (Japan)
Politicians from Akita Prefecture
21st-century Japanese politicians